Blakeley is an English surname. Notable people with the surname include:

Arthur Blakeley (1849–1934), Australian politician
Bill Blakeley (1934–2010),  American basketball coach
Ed Blakely, American Australian "Recovery Czar" in New Orleans
Eric Blakeley (b. 1965), English mountaineer, adventurer, and television journalist
John E. Blakeley (1888–1958), British film producer, director and screenwriter 
Johnston Blakeley (1781–1814), American naval officer
Lee Blakeley (1971–2017), British opera and theatre director
Paul Blakeley (born 1964), English cricketer
Peter Blakeley, Australian singer and songwriter
Philip Blakeley (1915–1994), New Zealand engineer and administrator
Phyllis Blakeley (1922–1986), Canadian historian, biographer and archivist
Robert Blakeley (1922–2017), American graphic designer
Steve Blakeley (born 1972), English rugby league footballer
Steven Blakeley (born 1982), British actor
William Blakeley (1830–1897), English actor

See also
Blakely (surname)
Blakley

English-language surnames